The 1993 season of the Ukrainian Championship was the 2nd season of Ukraine's women's football competitions. The championship ran from 18 April 1993 to 7 November 1993.

Teams

Team changes

Name changes
Tornado Kyiv, last season the club was known as Olimp Kyiv
Alina Kyiv, last season the club was known as Radosyn Kyiv

Higher League

League table

Top scorers

First League

League table

References

External links
WFPL.ua
Women's Football.ua

1993
1993–94 in Ukrainian association football leagues
1992–93 in Ukrainian association football leagues
Ukrainian Women's League
Ukrainian Women's League